Anthony "Tony" John Daly (born 25 July 1969 in Newcastle, New South Wales) was an Australian cricketer who played for the Tasmanian Tigers.

See also
 List of Tasmanian representative cricketers

External links
 
 

1969 births
Living people
Tasmania cricketers
Australian cricketers
Cricketers from Newcastle, New South Wales